Khalil Ibn Rountree Jr. (born February 26, 1990) is an American mixed martial artist who currently competes in the light heavyweight division of the Ultimate Fighting Championship (UFC).  As of January 24, 2023, he is #13 in the UFC light heavyweight rankings.

Background 
Rountree was born in [[Los Angeles]], [[California]]. When he was two years old, his father was shot and killed in an attempted robbery while working as the tour manager for [[Boyz II Men]].<ref></ref> Growing up overweight and self-described as "non-confrontational," Rountree was in a band traveling the country. Eating unhealthy and smoking cigarettes, he decided to begin training after watching The Ultimate Fighter with his brother. At the age of 20 and weighing 300 lbs, Rountree joined Wand Fight Team gym in an attempt to lose weight. After one year of MMA training, Rountree started his MMA amateur career in 2011. Before his UFC 236 fight against Eryk Anders, Rountree trained in Thailand, focusing on Muay Thai.

Mixed martial arts career

Resurrection Fighting Alliance 
Rountree had a record of 6–1 in his amateur fights, competing as a Middleweight under the Tuff-N-Uff and King of the Cage (KOTC) banners.

Rountree made his professional debut, as a light heavyweight, with Resurrection Fighting Alliance against Livingston Lukow at RFA 15 on June 6, 2014. Rountree won the fight by unanimous decision.

Rountree was scheduled to face Blake Troop in a 190 lbs catchweight bout at RFA 21 on December 5, 2014. Rountree won the fight by a first-round knockout, after just 39 seconds.

Rountree made his middleweight debut against Cameron Olson at RFA 25 on April 10, 2015. Rountree won the fight by a unanimous decision.

Rountree made his final appearance with RFA against Justin Polendey at RFA 33 on December 11, 2015. Rountree won the fight by first-round knockout.

The Ultimate Fighter 
In April 2016, Rountree competed as a fighter on The Ultimate Fighter: Team Joanna vs. Team Cláudia. In the first round, he faced Muhammed DeReese and won via knockout. In the elimination round, he faced Cory Hendricks and lost via submission in the first round.

Later in the show, Hendricks withdrew himself from the competition due to neck injury and Dana White decided to bring back Rountree for the semi-final round. Rountree moved on to faced Josh Stansbury and won via knockout in the first round to advance and face Andrew Sanchez at the finale.

Ultimate Fighting Championship 
Rountree made his promotional debut on July 8, 2016 at UFC The Ultimate Fighter 23 Finale for the TUF 23 Light Heavyweight title against Andrew Sanchez. He lost the fight via unanimous decision.

Rountree next faced Tyson Pedro at UFC Fight Night: Whittaker vs. Brunson on November 27, 2016. He was submitted via rear-naked choke in round one.

On his third fight Rountree faced Daniel Jolly at UFC Fight Night: Bermudez vs. The Korean Zombie on February 4, 2017. He won via knockout in the first round.

Rountree faced Paul Craig on July 16, 2017 at UFC Fight Night: Nelson vs. Ponzinibbio. He won the fight via knockout in the first round.

Rountree was expected to face Gökhan Saki on December 30, 2017 at UFC 219. However, Saki was forced to pull out, citing knee injury, and was replaced by Michał Oleksiejczuk. Rountree lost the fight by unanimous decision. However, after the fight, it was revealed that Oleksiejczuk had tested positive for clomiphene, an anti-estrogenic substance. As a result, the Nevada Athletic Commission (NAC) officially overturned the result of the fight to a no contest.

The bout between Rountree and Gökhan Saki eventually took place at UFC 226 on July 7, 2018. Rountree won the fight via knockout in round one. This fight earned him the Performance of the Night award.

Rountree faced promotional newcomer Johnny Walker on November 17, 2018 at UFC Fight Night 140. He lost the fight via knockout in the first round.

Rountree faced Eryk Anders on April 13, 2019 at UFC 236. He won the fight via unanimous decision.

Rountree faced Ion Cuțelaba on September 28, 2019 at UFC Fight Night 160. He lost via TKO in the first round.

Rountree was expected to face Sam Alvey on March 28, 2020 at UFC on ESPN: Ngannou vs. Rozenstruik. Due to the COVID-19 pandemic, the event was eventually postponed.

Despite talks of retiring after the scrapped bout with Alvey, Rountree signed a contract extension with the UFC in October 2020.

Rountree faced Marcin Prachnio on January 24, 2021  at UFC 257. He lost the fight via unanimous decision.

Rountree faced Modestas Bukauskas on September 4, 2021 at UFC Fight Night 191. He won the fight via TKO in round two after catching Bukauskas with an oblique kick, marking the first time the technique had been used to finish a fight in the UFC.

Rountree faced Karl Roberson on March 12, 2022 at UFC Fight Night 203. Rountree won the fight via TKO in round two. This win earned him the Performance of the Night award.

Rountree faced Dustin Jacoby  on October 29, 2022 at UFC Fight Night 213. He won the fight via split decision which was controversial.

Championships and achievements 
Ultimate Fighting Championship)
Performance of the Night (Two times)

Personal life 
Rountree enjoys dancing and listening to music. He is a fan of the Village People.

Mixed martial arts record 

|-
|Win
|align=center|11–5 (1)
|Dustin Jacoby
|Decision (split)
|UFC Fight Night: Kattar vs. Allen
|
|align=center|3
|align=center|5:00
|Las Vegas, Nevada, United States
|
|-
|Win
|align=center|10–5 (1)
|Karl Roberson
|TKO (body kick and punches)
|UFC Fight Night: Santos vs. Ankalaev
|
|align=center|2
|align=center|0:25
|Las Vegas, Nevada, United States
|
|-
|Win
|align=center|9–5 (1)
|Modestas Bukauskas
|TKO (leg kick)
|UFC Fight Night: Brunson vs. Till 
|
|align=center|2
|align=center|2:30
|Las Vegas, Nevada, United States
|
|-
|Loss
|align=center|8–5 (1)
|Marcin Prachnio
|Decision (unanimous)
|UFC 257
|
|align=center|3
|align=center|5:00
|Abu Dhabi, United Arab Emirates
|
|-
|Loss
|align=center|8–4 (1)
|Ion Cuțelaba
|TKO (elbows) 
|UFC Fight Night: Hermansson vs. Cannonier 
|
|align=center|1
|align=center|2:35
|Copenhagen, Denmark
|
|-
|Win
|align=center|8–3 (1)
|Eryk Anders
|Decision (unanimous)
|UFC 236 
|
|align=center|3
|align=center|5:00
|Atlanta, Georgia, United States
|
|-
|Loss
|align=center|7–3 (1)
|Johnny Walker
|KO (elbow)
|UFC Fight Night: Magny vs. Ponzinibbio 
|
|align=center|1
|align=center|1:57
|Buenos Aires, Argentina
|  
|-
|Win
|align=center|7–2 (1)
|Gökhan Saki
|TKO (punches)
|UFC 226 
|
|align=center|1
|align=center|1:36
|Las Vegas, Nevada, United States
|
|-
|NC
|align=center|6–2 (1)
|Michał Oleksiejczuk
|NC (overturned)
|UFC 219
|
|align=center|3
|align=center|5:00
|Las Vegas, Nevada, United States
|
|-
|Win
|align=center|6–2
|Paul Craig
|KO (punches)
|UFC Fight Night: Nelson vs. Ponzinibbio 
|
|align=center|1
|align=center|4:56
|Glasgow, Scotland
|
|-
| Win
| align=center|  5–2
| Daniel Jolly
| KO (knee)
| UFC Fight Night: Bermudez vs. The Korean Zombie
| 
| align=center| 1
| align=center| 0:52
| Houston, Texas, United States
|
|-
|Loss
| align=center|  4–2
| Tyson Pedro
| Submission (rear-naked choke)
| UFC Fight Night: Whittaker vs. Brunson
| 
| align=center| 1
| align=center| 4:07
| Melbourne, Australia
|
|-
| Loss
| align=center| 4–1
| Andrew Sanchez
| Decision (unanimous)
| The Ultimate Fighter: Team Joanna vs. Team Cláudia Finale
| 
| align=center| 3
| align=center| 5:00
| Las Vegas, Nevada, United States
|
|-
| Win
| align=center| 4–0
| Justin Polendey
| KO (punch)
| RFA 33
| 
| align=center| 1
| align=center| 1:42
| Costa Mesa, California, United States
|
|-
| Win
| align=center| 3–0
| Cameron Olson
| Decision (unanimous)
| RFA 25
| 
| align=center| 3
| align=center| 5:00
| Sioux Falls, South Dakota, United States
|
|-
| Win
| align=center| 2–0
| Blake Troop
| KO (punch)
| RFA 21
| 
| align=center| 1
| align=center| 0:39
| Costa Mesa, California, United States
|
|-
| Win
| align=center| 1–0
| Livingston Lukow
| Decision (unanimous)
| RFA 15
| 
| align=center| 3
| align=center| 5:00
| Culver City, California, United States
|
|-

|-
|Win
|align=center|2–1
|Josh Stansbury
|TKO (punches)
|rowspan=3|The Ultimate Fighter: Team Joanna vs. Team Cláudia
| (airdate)
|align=center|1
|align=center|4:15
|rowspan=3|Las Vegas, Nevada, United States
|
|-
|Loss
|align=center|1–1
|Cory Hendricks
|Submission (rear-naked choke) 
| (airdate)
|align=center|1
|align=center|2:34
|
|-
|Win
|align=center|1–0
|Muhammed Dereese
|TKO (punches and soccer kicks to the body)
| (airdate)
|align=center|2
|align=center|0:38
|
|-

|-
|Win
|align=center| 6-1
|Dylan Jahrling
|KO (punch)
|Tuff-N-Uff - Future Stars of MMA
|
|align=center|1
|align=center|1:47
|Las Vegas, Nevada, United States
|Won the Tuff-N-Uff Amateur Middleweight Championship.
|-
|Win
|align=center| 5-1
|Lee Cordova
|Submission (guillotine choke)
|Tuff-N-Uff - Festibrawl 6
|
|align=center|1
|align=center|0:49
|Las Vegas, Nevada, United States
|
|-
|Win
|align=center| 4-1
|Prentice Williams
|Decision (unanimous)
|Tuff-N-Uff - Knock Out Cancer 2
|
|align=center|3
|align=center|3:00
|Las Vegas, Nevada, United States
|
|-
|Win
|align=center| 3-1
|Giovani Zavala
|TKO (knee and punches)
|Tuff-N-Uff - Beauties and Beasts
|
|align=center|1
|align=center|0:30
|Las Vegas, Nevada, United States
|
|-
|Loss
|align=center| 2-1
|Aaron Fonseca
|N/A
|Nevada Regional Circuit
|
|align=center|N/A
|align=center|N/A
|Nevada, United States
|
|-
|Win
|align=center| 2-0
|Niels Berlemann
|KO (punch)
|KOTC - Future Legends 2
|
|align=center|1
|align=center|0:16
|Las Vegas, Nevada, United States
|
|-
|Win
|align=center| 1-0
|Travis Jelmyer
|TKO (punches)
|Tuff-N-Uff - Future Stars of MMA
|
|align=center|1
|align=center|0:21
|Las Vegas, Nevada, United States
|
|-
|}

See also
 List of current UFC fighters
 List of male mixed martial artists

References

External links

 

Living people
1990 births
American male mixed martial artists
Light heavyweight mixed martial artists
Mixed martial artists utilizing Muay Thai
Mixed martial artists from California
Sportspeople from Los Angeles
American Muay Thai practitioners
American expatriate sportspeople in Thailand
Ultimate Fighting Championship male fighters